A caudillo (Spanish pronunciation: [kawˈdiʎo]; Old Spanish: cabdillo, from Latin capitellum, diminutive of caput "head". Caudillo means "little head" or "little chief") is part of the larger Iberian tradition of authoritarian leaders, with roots in the Iberian past, particularly in the Reconquista. A number of military leaders who were part of the Spanish American struggle for independence took on political roles in during the establishment of new sovereign nation-states. The establishment of military strong men as the head of new national governments did not generally come via elections, but many did have strong popular support. Caudillos often have a personalist connection with their popular followers, combining charisma and machismo ("manliness"), access to political and economic power.  They often desire to legitimize their rule.  Many caudillos brought order to their areas of control, but also resorted to violence with their armed supporters to achieve it.  The early nineteenth century has been considered the "Age of Caudillos," but authoritarian regimes existed in the twentieth century as well, with caudillismo casting a long shadow.

List of caudillos

Argentina
 José Félix Aldao
 Gregorio Aráoz de Lamadrid
 Nazario Benavídez
 Pedro Castelli
 Manuel Dorrego
 Pascual Echagüe
 Pedro Ferré
 Andrés Guazurary
 Santos Guayama
 Martín Miguel de Güemes
 Alejandro Heredia
 Juan Felipe Ibarra
 Juan Lavalle
 Estanislao López
 Ricardo López Jordán
 Bartolomé Mitre
 José María Paz
 Ángel Vicente Peñaloza
 Juan Perón
 Juan Facundo Quiroga<ref>Domingo F. Sarmiento, "Facundo Quiroga: The Caudillo as Barbarian" in Caudillos''', ed. Hamill, pp. 107–114.</ref>
 Francisco Ramírez
 Julio Argentino Roca
 Juan Manuel de Rosas
 Juan Saá
 Antonino Taboada
 Justo José de Urquiza
 Felipe Varela
 Jorge Rafael Videla
 Juan de Dios Videla

Bolivia
 José Ballivián
 Hugo Banzer
 Antonio Huachaca
 Manuel Isidoro Belzu
 Hilarión Daza
 Mariano Melgarejo
 Andrés de Santa Cruz
 Óscar Únzaga
 José Miguel de Velasco

Chile
 Arturo Alessandri
 Vicente Benavides
 José Miguel Carrera
 Ramón Freire
 Carlos Ibáñez del Campo
 Manuel Montt Torres
 Bernardo O'Higgins
 Augusto Pinochet
 Diego Portales
 José Joaquín Prieto

Colombia
 Sergio Arboleda
 Tomás Cipriano de Mosquera
 Jorge Eliécer Gaitán
 Alfonso López Pumarejo
 Rafael Núñez
 Aquileo Parra
 Gustavo Rojas Pinilla
 Rafael Uribe Uribe
 Marceliano Vélez

Costa Rica
 José Figueres Ferrer
 José María Castro Madriz, "Founder of the Republic"
 Juan Rafael Mora Porras
 Gregorio José Ramírez

Cuba
 Ignacio Agramonte
 Fulgencio Batista
 Fidel Castro
 Carlos Manuel de Céspedes
 Máximo Gómez
 Antonio Maceo

Dominican Republic
 Buenaventura Báez
 Joaquín Balaguer
 José Núñez de Cáceres
 Pedro Santana
 Rafael Trujillo, "The Benefactor"

Ecuador
 Juan José Flores
 Carlos de Montúfar, "The First Caudillo"
 Juan Pío de Montúfar
 Pedro de Montúfar
 Gabriel García Moreno
 Eloy Alfaro
 José María Velasco Ibarra
 José Joaquín de Olmedo

El Salvador
 Manuel José Arce
 Gerardo Barrios
 Francisco Dueñas
 Francisco Malespín
 Maximiliano Hernández Martínez
 Santiago González Portillo
 Tomás Regalado Romero

Guatemala
 Justo Rufino Barrios
 Rafael Carrera
 Manuel Estrada Cabrera
 Serapio Cruz
 Miguel García Granados
 Efraín Ríos Montt
 Jorge Ubico

Honduras
 Tiburcio Carías Andino
 Luis Bográn
 Policarpo Bonilla
 José Trinidad Cabañas
 Francisco Ferrera
 Francisco Morazán
 José Cecilio del Valle, "The Wise"DIPLOMATICO DESTACADO mexicodiplomatico.org. Universidad Nacional Autonoma de Mexico. Retrieved March 25, 2010.Honduras & The Bay Islands By Gary Chandler, Liza Prado. p. 100

Mexico
 Juan Álvarez
 Plutarco Elías Calles, "El Jefe Máximo"
 Lázaro Cárdenas
 Venustiano Carranza, "Primer Jefe"
 Saturnino Cedillo
 Adolfo de la Huerta
 Porfirio Díaz
 Vicente Guerrero
 Agustín Guzmán, "Héroe Altense"
 Miguel Hidalgo
 Victoriano Huerta
 Agustín de Iturbide
 Manuel Lozada, "El Tigre de Alica"
 Francisco Xavier Mina
 José María Morelos
 Álvaro Obregón
 Pascual Orozco
 Antonio López de Santa Anna
 Santiago Vidaurri
 Pancho Villa, "The Centaur of the North" 
 Emiliano Zapata

Nicaragua
 Juan Argüello
 Manuel Antonio de la Cerda
 Anastasio Somoza Debayle
 Casto Fonseca
 Anastasio Somoza García
 Bernardo Méndez de Figueroa, "El Pavo"
 José Trinidad Muñoz
 José Anacleto Ordóñez
 Daniel Ortega
 Augusto César Sandino
 Fulgencio Vega
 José Santos Zelaya

Panama
 Juan Eligio Alzuru
 José Domingo Espinar
 Tomás de Herrera
 José de Fábrega, "Liberator of the Isthmus"
 Manuel Noriega 
 Omar Torrijos

Paraguay
 Eusebio Ayala
 José Gaspar Rodríguez de Francia, "El Supremo"
 Rafael Franco
 Carlos Antonio López
 Francisco Solano López
 Alfredo Stroessner, "El Tiranosauro"James D. Cockcroft, "Paraguay's Stroessner: The Ultimate Caudillo" in Caudillos, Ed. Hugh M. Hamill, pp. 335–348.

Peru
 Óscar Benavides
 Andrés Avelino Cáceres
 Ramón Castilla
 Luis Miguel Sánchez Cerro
 Alberto Fujimori
 Agustín Gamarra
 Antonio Gutiérrez de la Fuente
 Miguel Iglesias
 Augusto B. Leguía
 Lizardo Montero Flores
 Domingo Nieto
 Manuel Odría 
 Nicolás de Piérola
 Felipe Santiago Salaverry
 Juan Crisóstomo Torrico
 Manuel Ignacio de Vivanco

Puerto Rico
 Francisco Ramírez Medina
 Manuel Rojas

Uruguay
 Gregorio Conrado Álvarez
 Timoteo Aparicio
 José Gervasio Artigas
 José Batlle y Ordóñez
 Venancio Flores
 Leandro Gómez
 Juan Antonio Lavalleja
 Lorenzo Latorre
 Manuel Oribe
 Fructuoso Rivera
 Aparicio Saravia

Venezuela
 José Tomás Boves
 Cipriano Castro
 Hugo Chávez
 Joaquín Crespo
 Juan Crisóstomo Falcón
 Juan Vicente Gómez
 Antonio Guzmán Blanco
 Nicolás Maduro
 Santiago Mariño
 José Tadeo Monagas
 José Antonio Páez
 Marcos Pérez Jiménez
 Manuel Piar
 Carlos Rangel Garbiras
 José Félix Ribas
 José Antonio Yáñez
 Ezequiel Zamora

See also
Caudillo
Continuismo

 Further reading 
Definitions, Theories, and Contexts

Alexander, Robert J. "Caudillos, Coroneis, and Political Bosses in Latin America." In Presidential Power in Latin American Politics, ed. Thomas V. DiBacco. New York: Prager 1977.
Beezley, William H. "Caudillismo: An Interpretative Note." Journal of Inter-American Studies 11 (July 1969): 345–52.
Collier, David, ed. The New Authoritarianism in Latin America. Princeton: Princeton University Press 1979.
 Dealy, Glenn Cudill. The Public Man: An Interpretation of Latin America and other Catholic Countries. Amherst: University of Massachusetts Press 1977.
 
DiTella, Torcuato S. Latin American Politics: A Theoretical Framework. Austin: University of Texas Press 1989.
Hale, Charles A. "The Reconstruction of Nineteenth-Century Politics in Spanish America: A Case for the History of Ideas." Latin American Research Review 8 (Summer 1973), 53-73.
Hamill, Hugh, ed. Caudillos: Dictators in Spanish America. Norman: University of Oklahoma Press 1992.
Humphreys, R.A. "The Caudillo Tradition." in Tradition and Revolt in Latin America, 216-28. New York: Columbia University Press 1969.
 Johnson, John J. "Foreign Factors in Dictatorship in Latin America". Pacific Historical Review 20 (1951)
Kern, Robert, ed. The Caciques: Oligarchical Politics and the System of Caciquismo in the Luso-Latin World. Albuquerque: University of New Mexico Press 1973.
 Loveman, Brian. The Constitution of Tyranny: Regimes of Exception in Spanish America. Pittsburgh: University of Pittsburgh Press 1993.
 Lynch, John, Caudillos in Spanish America, 1800-1850. Oxford: Oxford University Press 1992.
Pleasants, Edwin Hemingway, The Caudillo: a Study in Latin-American Dictatorships. Monmouth, IL: Commercial Art Press 1959.
 Smith, Peter H. "Political Legitimacy in Spanish America" in New Approaches to Latin American History, Richard Graham and Peter Smith, eds. 1974.
Wolf, Eric R. and Edward C. Hanson, "Caudillo Politics: A Structural Analysis." Comparative Studies in Society and History 9 (1966–67): 168-79.

Regions and Individuals

 Balfour, Sebastian. Castro (1990)
 Brading, D.A., ed. Caudillo and Peasant in the Mexican Revolution. Cambridge: Cambridge University Press 1980.
 Gilmore, Robert L. Caudillism and Militarism in Venezuela, 1810-1910. 1994.
 Haigh, Roger M. Martin Güemes: Tyrant or Tool? A Study of the Sources of Power of an Argentine Caudillo. 1968.
 Hamill, Hugh M., ed. Caudillos: Dictators in Spanish America. Selections on Hidalgo, Quiroga, Moreno, Díaz, Trujillo, Perón, Castro, Pinochet, and Stroessner. Norman: University of Oklahoma Press 1992.
 Lynch, John. "Bolívar and the Caudillos". Hispanic American Historical Review 63 No. 1 (1983), 3-35.
 Lynch, John. Argentine Dictator: Juan Manuel de Rosas, 1829-1852. 1981.
 Lynch, John. Caudillos in Spanish America, 1800-1850. Chapters on Rosas, Páez, Santa Anna, and Carrera. Oxford: Clarendon Press 1992.
 Page, Joseph A. Perón: A Biography. 1983.
 Park, James William. Rafael Núñez and the Politics of Colombian Regionalism, 1863-1886. (1985)
 Smith, Peter H. Democracy in Latin America: Political Change in Comparative Perspective. New York: Oxford University Press 2005.
 Wiarda, Howard. Dictatorship and Development: The Methods of Control in Trujillo's Dominican Republic. 1968.
 

 Woodward, Ralph Lee. Rafael Carrera and the Emergence of the Republic of Guatemala, 1821-1871''. 1993.

References 

Authoritarianism

Dictatorship
History of North America
History of South America
Caudillos
Latin America
Titles of national or ethnic leadership